Bernard Laurence Hiett (1909 – 3 May 1930) was an English air pilot who became famous for his exploits in motorcycle racing, where he achieved several world records in the sport. He has a memorial in Reading Old Cemetery which is Grade II listed.

Life and career

Born in Reading, Berkshire, Hieatt, was the eldest son of a Reading butcher, Benoni (Noni) Hieatt and his wife Lizzie Godfrey.

He was a member of the Reading and District Motorcycling Club, where he was captain. He was also an air pilot and used to rent out a Moth aeroplane to fly to racing venues.

He started in dirt track racing for a while, then went to Brooklands, the famous Surrey racetrack in 1927, to race for various engine manufacturers. Achieving distinction on the road and track, he competed on a Cotton in the 1928 TT Races on the Isle of Man when he finished 9th and in 1929 he started in three races but did not finish in any of these races. He was part of the British Motor Cycle team, touring Europe and Egypt and in 1929 won the ‘Sir Charles Wakefield Cup' at Brooklands.

He took several world records, creating two world records in the two hundred miles motorcycle and side car race and won races at Brooklands. He achieved a coveted BMCRC 'Gold Star' in 1929 for lapping the Brooklands track at over 100 mph.

Death
On 3 May 1930 at Brooklands, Hieatt had broken the 100 miles record and the 2 hours record, covering . This was achieved despite heavy rain and poor visibility. Hieatt's motorcycle had sufficient fuel for the race, but a leaking tank forced him into the pits 8 laps from the finish. During the refuelling pitstop, Hieatt also swapped his goggles for a new pair, as the ones he was wearing were covered in mud.

With another bike  in front of him, Hieatt attempted an overtake on the inside, but steered too close to the grass verge. F. Mathews, the sidecar passenger, was trapped face downwards, but escaped with severe shock. Hieatt was thrown  into the air and hit a concrete post, breaking his leg, shattering his skull and lacerating his brain; he died instantly. Officials and a doctor quickly arrived with an ambulance to the crash site. When Hieatt was found he was not wearing goggles, leading to the assumption that he threw them off while still riding.

Hieatt's death was the first motorcycling fatality at Brooklands since the First World War. Death by misadventure was the verdict of the inquest, while an official described Bernard as, "one of the finest riders on the track and in every respect an all round man".

Legacy 

Bernard Laurence Hieatt's grave in Reading Old Cemetery in Cemetery Junction in Reading is a Grade II listed memorial, with a statue of him in full racing gear. On the memorial it reads, 

A development of flats on Silver Street, Reading has also been named Hieatt Close in his honour.

References

External links
Research on B.L. Hieatt  from the reading old cemetery website

English motorcycle racers
Motorcycle racers who died while racing
1930 deaths
People from Reading, Berkshire
Grade II listed buildings in Reading
1909 births